Amantaka is a luxury hotel in Luang Prabang, Laos. The hotel, located in a French colonial building, is operated by Aman Resorts and opened in September 2009. The hotel is located in the northwestern part of the city in the old town area, several metres from the Mekong River and approximately 400 metres northeast of the Royal Palace. The hotel encourages the education of the guests in traditional Lao culture and hires such cultural advisers to teach the guests on a regular basis in traditional Lao customs and practices. Originally completed in 1923 as the Viceroy family residence of Prince Boun Khong, Amantaka’s Aman Villa is situated in close proximity to Amantaka, allowing guests easy access to all the resort’s facilities.

History
The opening ceremony in September 2009 was attended by several important Laotian government officials, including the Minister of Information and Culture (Mounkeo Oraboun), Minister to the President's Office (Soubanh Srithirath), Minister to the Prime Minister's Office (Cheuang Sombounkhanh), the president of the Aman Resorts group and various senior officials and businessmen.  The building dates to the French colonial period in the early twentieth century. The building was bought by Aman Resorts and was managed by an Australian, Gary Tyson, who served as General Manager from 2009 - October 2015. The current General Manager is Donald Wong, who took over from Livio Ranza on the 26th October 2016. Donald worked at Amansara, Amankora and Aman New Delhi from 2006 for 5 years in the sales, and marketing and operational areas. Prior to his return to Aman, Donald worked in Hong Kong, with Mandarin Oriental, and most recently, in Thailand. In 2010 the hotel was featured by the American luxury travel magazine, Condé Nast Traveler on both their Asian and Asian and Australasian "Hot List"s.

Architecture
The hotel is located in a French Indochinese colonial building, characterised by its low height and extensive width, containing many pilasters to support the roof.  It is set in gardens and is painted in white with a red-orange roof. The hotel name, Amantaka, is derived from the Sanskrit word aman meaning "peace" and the word taka, meaning "teacher of the Buddha".

Suites

A boutique hotel, it contains 24 lavish suites, encircling a central courtyard and is designed with a mixture of traditional Lao furnishings  and modern. The suites range in size from 70 to 120 square metres and include eight suites, four pool suites, eight Khan pool suites, two Mekong pool suites and two Amantaka pool suites. The suites are accessed through louvered doors from the courtyard. All of the rooms have a king-sized bed centre of the suites beneath a traditional high ceiling. The rooms are painted in white and have mahogany or dark wood furnishings and windows. The rooms are reported to be between US$700 and US$1,400 a night, the most expensive being the Amantaka pool suites ($1400) followed by the Mekong pool suites ($1200).

The hotel encourages the education of the guests in traditional Lao culture and hires such cultural advisers to teach the guests on a regular basis in traditional Lao customs and practices.

References

External links

Official site
Hotel inauguration video
Video of the hotel by Condé Nast Traveler
Photographs

Aman Resorts
Hotels in Laos
Buildings and structures in Luang Prabang
Hotels established in 2009